Ananjerd (also Romanized as Anānjerd) is a village in Mazraeh Now Rural District, in the Central District of Ashtian County, Markazi Province, Iran. At the 2006 census, its population was 177, in 63 families.

References 

Populated places in Ashtian County